Treston Decoud (born August 1, 1993) is an American gridiron football defensive back who is a free agent. He was most recently a member of the Edmonton Elks of the Canadian Football League (CFL). He played college football at Oregon State.

Early years
Decoud attended Lakeshore High School. As a senior, he registered 56 tackles, 3 interceptions, 23 receptions for 356 yards, 3 receiving touchdowns, 12 carries for 178 rushing yards and one rushing touchdown. He received All-district honors at 4 different positions during his prep career.

He qualified for the state track & field championships as a sprinter in his last 2 years.

College career
Decoud accepted a football scholarship from Chadron State College. He was redshirted in 2012. As a freshman in 2013, he made 4 tackles and one pass defensed in 10 games as a backup.

He transferred to Northwest Mississippi Community College for his sophomore season in 2014. He posted 38 tackles, 6 interceptions (third in the nation), 7 passes defensed (led the team), one forced fumble and 2 blocked kicks. He received All-MACJC, All-NJCAA Region 23 and NJCAA All-American honors.

Decoud transferred to Oregon State University for his junior season in 2015. He was named the starter at left cornerback, appearing in 10 games with 9 starts. He missed 2 contests with an injury. He registered 50 tackles (fifth on the team), one sack, 3.5 tackles for loss, 5 passes defensed (led the team)

As a senior in 2016, he started all 12 games at left cornerback. He recorded 58 tackles (sixth on the team), 2 interceptions, 10 passes defensed (led the team). He returned an interception for a 75-yard touchdown against Idaho State University.

Professional career

Houston Texans
Decoud was selected by the Houston Texans in the fifth round (169th overall) of the 2017 NFL Draft. On May 12, the Texans signed Decoud to a four-year, $2.64 million contract that included a signing bonus of $249,339.

On September 1, 2018, Decoud was waived by the Texans.

Dallas Cowboys
On September 4, 2018, Decoud was signed to the Dallas Cowboys' practice squad. He was promoted to the active roster on November 1, 2018. He was waived on November 9, 2018. He was re-signed to the practice squad on November 26, 2018. He signed a reserve/future contract with the Cowboys on January 15, 2019. He was released on August 31, 2019.

Dallas Renegades (XFL)
Decoud joined the Dallas Renegades of the XFL after being selected in the 2020 XFL Draft. In March, amid the COVID-19 pandemic, the league announced that it would be cancelling the rest of the season. Playing in all 5 games, he registered 13 tackles and no interceptions. He had his contract terminated when the league suspended operations on April 10, 2020.

Toronto Argonauts
On February 3, 2021, Decoud signed with the Toronto Argonauts of the Canadian Football League (CFL). He played in 13 regular season games in 2021 where he had 25 defensive tackles and one special teams tackle. He spent part of 2022 training camp with the team, but was released after the first pre-season game on May 29, 2022.

Edmonton Elks
After being cut by Toronto, Decoud joined the Edmonton Elks on June 7, 2022. He was released on December 1, 2022.

Personal life
He is a cousin of former NFL player Thomas DeCoud.

References

External links
 Oregon State Beavers bio
 NWMCC Rangers bio
 Chadron State Eagles bio
 

1993 births
Living people
Players of American football from Louisiana
People from Covington, Louisiana
American football cornerbacks
Chadron State Eagles football players
Northwest Mississippi Rangers football players
Oregon State Beavers football players
Houston Texans players
Dallas Cowboys players
Dallas Renegades players
Toronto Argonauts players